The Club de Futbol Espana De Puebla was a Mexican club that was one of the pioneers of association football in the state and city of Puebla. The club was founded in 1915 as Puebla FC, by mostly Mexican natives and the Spaniard community. The club was one of the most successful of the amateur era in Puebla. The club would dissolve in the early 1940s when it merged with Asturias de Puebla, a few years before professional football was established in Mexico. History would have it that the club would return and form part of Puebla F.C., the same name the club was founded with in 1915.

History

The club was founded in 1915 under the name Puebla FC just 8 years after Puebla A.C., the first football club in the state, dissolved in 1907. To the contrary of Puebla A.C., Puebla FC was founded by the Mexican Spanish community of the city of Puebla. In 1916 the club changed its name to Espana De Puebla aster the clubs associated itself with Real Club España of Mexico City. During its first years of existence the club struggled to find opponents in the state of Puebla, finding few in San Martin, which forced the club to travel east to the state of Veracruz where football was more developed. In Orizaba, Veracruz, a town in Mexico where football clubs rivaled in experience and numbers to the ones in the capital, the club had its first real matches against experienced clubs such as Unión Deportiva Río Blanco and Club Cervantes.

First rivalry
The club's first rivalry was born in 1918 when Club Reforma de Puebla was founded by French Mexican Enrique Lederman. This became strong during its first years, being that both clubs shared the Estadio Velodromo. The rivalry came to an en in 1921 when Club Reforma folded due to economic problems. From this two more clubs were born – Club Universal and Club Mexico, who were no real rivals to Espana.

Golden years

After its main rival club Reforma disappeared in 1921, the club felt the effect and had three years of mediocre play. It was in 1925 when Laureno R Alvarez took over the presidency of the club which lifted the club back up. During these years the club started traveling to states like Veracruz, Mexico City, and Hidalgo to play against top-tier opposition such as Club America, C.F. Aurrerá, Germania F.V., C.F. Pachuca, and Albinegros de Orizaba – clubs who played in the semi professional Primera Fuerza league. In 1926 the club managed to win the Copa Excelsior which they won for a second time in 1928. In 1927 the club won the Copa Gallegos against Club Pachuca (the cup was donated by a wealthy man of the city of Pachuca). The club's success was noticed in Mexico City in particular; Real Club España would buy some of the club's players. One of the most successful players and a fan favorite was Joaquín Colubi Rodríguez. In 1930 Antonio Guerra took over in a time where the club was just about to start the biggest rivalry in its history.

Dissolution and fusion
By the early 1940s the club was still in a heated competition against arch rival Club Asturias, with Asturias winning the league in 1939 for the second consecutive year. This all came to an abrupt end in 1942/1943 when the club was forced to join forces with Club Asturias, in most part due to economic problems. Club Asturias had a better economic force backing the club with its owner Manuel Hill. The fusion did not last long, being that in Mexico City and around the country club owners and donors were already in plans to form a professional football league in Mexico, which came to be in 1943. During this time former presidents, donors, ex-players of both Club Espana and Club Asturias joined forces and brought to life the new club Puebla F.C., which they both rallied around.

Honours
 Liga Amateur de Puebla – 1928, 1929, 1930 
 Copas Amistosas
 Copa Excelsior – 1926, 1928
 Trofeo Gallegos – 1927

Notable players

References

Defunct football clubs in Mexico
Association football clubs established in 1915
Association football clubs disestablished in 1943
1915 establishments in Mexico
1943 disestablishments in Mexico
Defunct football clubs in Puebla